Allan Fredberg is a Swedish retired footballer. He made 16 Allsvenskan appearances for Djurgården in the 1930s.

References

Swedish footballers
Djurgårdens IF Fotboll players
Allsvenskan players
Association footballers not categorized by position
Year of birth missing